The 2018 Intercontinental GT Challenge was the third season of the Intercontinental GT Challenge. The season featured four rounds, starting with the Liqui Moly Bathurst 12 Hour on 4 February and concluding with the California 8 Hours on 28 October. Markus Winkelhock was the defending Drivers' champion and Audi was the defending Manufacturers' champion.

The series reverted to rules of the inaugural season, where each manufacturer was permitted to nominate up to four cars in each event. In 2017 all cars and drivers scored points towards the championship.

Calendar
At the annual press conference during the 2017 24 Hours of Spa on 28 July, the Stéphane Ratel Organisation announced the 2018 calendar. Suzuka was added to the schedule, replacing the Sepang 12 Hours, which was cancelled the season before. On 25 November 2017, it was announced the race at Laguna Seca was moved a week.

Entry list

Race results

NOTE:  California 8 Hours results announced 27 July 2019 following review when the original winner, the No. 42 Strakka Racing team, was disqualified when a driver was disqualified for doping violations.

Championship standings
Scoring system
Championship points were awarded for the first ten positions in each race. Entries were required to complete 75% of the winning car's race distance in order to be classified and earn points, with the exception of Bathurst where a car simply had to cross the finish line to be classified. Individual drivers were required to participate for a minimum of 25 minutes in order to earn championship points in any race. A manufacturer only received points for its two highest placed cars in each round.

Drivers' championships
The results indicate the classification relative to other drivers in the series, not the classification in the race.

Notes
1 – Luca Stolz's result with Porsche did not count, because he scored more points with Mercedes-AMG.
2 – Ineligible to score points.
3 – Álvaro Parente's result with Bentley did not count, because he scored more points with Mercedes-AMG.
4 - Results finalised on 27 July 2019 following review of California 8 Hours.

Bronze Drivers
{|
|valign="top"|

Manufacturers' championship
Only the top two cars for a manufacturer are eligible for points.

See also
Intercontinental GT Challenge

Notes

References

External links

 
2018 in motorsport